Boronia xanthastrum is a species of small shrub that is endemic to the Northern Territory. It has yellow, star-like hairs on the young branches, leaves and parts of the flowers, elliptical to lance-shaped leaves and small yellowish green flowers.

Description
Its branches, leaves and parts of the flowers are covered with star-like yellow hairs that turn white as they age. The sepals, but not the petals enlarge as the fruit develops.

Taxonomy and naming
Boronia xanthastrum was first formally described in 1997 by Marco F. Duretto who published the description in the journal Australian Systematic Botany from specimens collected by Lyndley Craven near Twin Falls in 1980. The specific epithet (xanthastrum) is derived from ancient Greek words meaning "yellow" and "star", referring to the colour and shape of the hairs that give this species a yellow appearance.

Distribution and habitat
This boronia grows on schists and sandstone in heath and woodland and is mainly found in Kakadu National Park but also occurs in Nitmiluk National Park and disjunctly in north-east Arnhem Land.

Conservation status
This species is classified as "near threatened" under the Territory Parks and Wildlife Conservation Act 2000. It was previously listed as "vulnerable" under the Australian Government Environment Protection and Biodiversity Conservation Act 1999.

References 

xanthastrum
Flora of the Northern Territory
Plants described in 1997
Taxa named by Marco Duretto